Jaro Zawislan is a college soccer coach, most recently for Cornell University.  He played professionally as a goalkeeper in the USISL, Continental Indoor Soccer League and Polish Second Division.

Player
Zawislan attended Clemson University where he played on the men’s soccer team from 1990 to 1993.  In his 88 games with the Tigers, he made 446 saves and was the 1993 Atlantic Coast Conference tournament MVP.   He earned his bachelor’s degree in computer science from Clemson in 1993 and bachelor's degree in education from the University of Toronto in 1999.  In 1994, Zawislan played for the Columbia Heat in the USISL, being named an Atlantic Division All Star.  In January 1995, the Toronto Shooting Stars selected Zawislan in the National Professional Soccer League draft.  He chose not to sign with Toronto but play in the Poland II Liga with Arka Gdynia.  In 1996, he returned to the United States where he signed with the Detroit Neon of the Continental Indoor Soccer League.  In the fall of 1996, he finally signed with the Toronto Shooting Stars, playing one game in November 1996 in place of injured starter Paolo Ceccarelli.  In 2000, Zawislan played one game for the Atlanta Silverbacks in the 2000 A-League.

Coach
Zawislan has held numerous coaching positions.  In 1999, Zawislan was hired by Creighton University as an assistant coach with the men’s soccer team.  When Creighton head coach, Bret Simon moved to Stanford University, Zawislan followed him in February 2001.  In 2002, he moved to Syracuse University where he served as an assistant coach.  In April 2009, Cornell University signed Zawislan as head coach of the men's soccer team. In January 2016, Zawislan left the program at Cornell and was replaced by former Stanford assistant coach John Smith.

References

External links
 Syracuse University coaching profile

Living people
Arka Gdynia players
Association football goalkeepers
Atlanta Silverbacks players
Clemson Tigers men's soccer players
Columbia Heat players
Continental Indoor Soccer League coaches
Continental Indoor Soccer League players
Detroit Neon players
National Professional Soccer League (1984–2001) players
Stanford Cardinal men's soccer coaches
Syracuse Orange men's soccer coaches
Toronto Shooting Stars players
A-League (1995–2004) players
USISL players
Cornell Big Red men's soccer coaches
American soccer players
Year of birth missing (living people)
American soccer coaches
Creighton Bluejays men's soccer coaches